The Heart Eyes (😍) emoji is an ideogram that is used in communication to express happiness towards something. The Unicode Consortium listed it as the third most used emoji in 2019.

Development and usage history
Development of emojis began in Japan in the 1990s, when NTT DoCoMo released a pager with the option to send a red heart in the text. Another pager was released and marketed at businesspeople by NTT DoCoMo but without the red heart. It received backlash, which caused NTT DoCoMo to change its stance and alert competitors to the demand for such ideograms. The concept exploded in the country, causing NTT DoCoMo employee Shigetaka Kurita to create a set, which became known as emojis.

Many of Shigetaka Kurita focused on icon-like designs, portraying the weather, occupations, and mood. He didn't use any of the yellow-faced emojis we frequently use today. At some point in the evolution history, the yellow-faced emoji and the hearts were combined to create the heart eyes emoji. The first known version of this was in The Smiley Dictionary. The Dictionary was a plugin created by Nicolas Loufrani in the late 90s to allow people to send emoticons online. Unlike Kurita's designs, Loufrani focused solely on smiley designs representing emotion.

One of these designs was titled "love", which replaced the eyes of the smiley with two red hearts. It had a typical smiley design, with a broad smile. Later designs from Unicode changed the design to have a slightly opened mouth.

Popularity
Since the launch of the Unicode emoji set, the heart eyes emoji has grown in popularity. In 2019, it was rated as the third most used emoji behind the Red Heart emoji and Face with Tears of Joy emoji. It frequently appears in the top 10 lists for the most common emoji.

References

Individual emoji
Heart symbols